Dare the School Build a New Social Order? is a collection of speeches by educator George S. Counts on the role and limits of progressive education.

Further reading 

 
 
 
 
 
 

1932 non-fiction books
American books
Progressive education
English-language books
20th-century speeches
Books about education
John Day Company books